Achryson maculipenne is a species of longhorn beetle in the subfamily Cerambycinae. It was described by Lacordaire in 1869. It is known from southern Brazil and Bolivia.

References

Achrysonini
Beetles described in 1869